Flavimarina flava is a Gram-negative, aerobic, rod-shaped, non-spore-forming and motile bacterium from the genus of Flavimarina which has been isolated from the plant Salicornia herbacea from the Yellow Sea.

References 

Flavobacteria
Bacteria described in 2017